The Bioinformatics Resource Centers (BRCs) are a group of five Internet-based research centers established in 2004 and funded by NIAID (the National Institute of Allergy and Infectious Diseases.) The BRCs were formed in response to the threats posed by emerging and re-emerging pathogens, particularly Centers for Disease Control and Prevention (CDC) Category A, B, and C pathogens, and their potential use in bioterrorism. The intention of NIAID in funding these bioinformatics centers is to assist researchers involved in the experimental characterization of such pathogens and the formation of drugs, vaccines, or diagnostic tools to combat them.

The main goals of the BRCs are as follows:

1)	To create comprehensive databases of reliable, up-to-date bioinformatic data (genetic, proteomic, biochemical, or microbiological) related to the pathogens of interest; 
2)	To provide researchers with easy access to this data through Internet-based search and data retrieval user interfaces; 
3)	To provide researchers with relevant, state-of-the art computational tools for bioinformatic analysis of these data.

The five BRCs are supported by various institutions, both publicly and privately owned, throughout the USA and Canada. Each BRC focuses on a different group of pathogens.

See also
 National Institutes of Health
 National Institute of Allergy and Infectious Diseases
 Bioinformatics
 Categories of biological agents

References

External links
 NIAID home page
 Bioinformatics Resource Centers The NIAID page describing the goals and activities of the BRCs
 EuPathDB Eukaryotic Pathogens BRC
 IRD Influenza Research Database BRC
 ViPR Virus Database and Analysis Resource BRC
 PATRIC PathoSystems Resource Integration Center
 VectorBase VectorBase BRC

National Institutes of Health
Medical research organizations
Organizations established in 2004
Bioinformatics organizations